The Codice di Staffarda is a musical codex from Staffarda Abbey (Santa Maria di Staffarda), a Cistercian monastery located near Saluzzo in north-west Italy. The codex includes works by composers including the otherwise unknown Engarandus Juvenis and Antoine Brumel.

References

Renaissance music manuscript sources